Wilson Fernando Cepeda Cuervo (born September 2, 1980 in Paipa, Boyacá) is a Colombian former professional road racing cyclist.

Major results

2002
1st Stage 5 Vuelta al Tolima
2003
1st Stage 3 Vuelta a Cundinamarca
2005
1st Stage 4 Vuelta a Ávila
2008
1st Overall Clasica Alcaldía de Pasca
2009
1st Stage 4 Vuelta a Colombia

External links

 

1980 births
Living people
Colombian male cyclists
Vuelta a Colombia stage winners
Sportspeople from Boyacá Department
21st-century Colombian people